Danilov (masculine) or Danilova (feminine, or masculine genitive) is the name of several inhabited localities in Russia.

Modern localities
Urban localities
Danilov, Yaroslavl Oblast, a town in Danilovsky District of Yaroslavl Oblast

Rural localities
Danilov, Rostov Oblast, a khutor in Grutsinovskoye Rural Settlement of Kamensky District in Rostov Oblast

Abolished localities
Danilov, Kostroma Oblast, a pochinok in Petretsovsky Selsoviet of Vokhomsky District of Kostroma Oblast; abolished on October 6, 2004

Alternative names
Danilova, alternative name of Danilovo, a village under the administrative jurisdiction of Domodedovo Town Under Oblast Jurisdiction in Moscow Oblast; 
Danilova, alternative name of Danilovo, a village in Averkiyevskoye Rural Settlement of Pavlovo-Posadsky District in Moscow Oblast; 
Danilova, alternative name of Danilovo, a village under the administrative jurisdiction of the Town of Yegoryevsk in Yegoryevsky District of Moscow Oblast;

References

Notes

Sources